Umaru Abdulrahman Dikko (31 December 1936 – 1 July 2014) was a Nigerian politician. He was an adviser to President Shehu Shagari and served as minister for transportation from 1979 to 1983.

Early life 
Dikko was born in Wamba. Wamba is small village near Zaria in Kaduna state of northern Nigeria. He spent his early school years in Zaria before receiving his Bachelor of Science from University of London. Before entering Nigeria's politics he worked for BBC's Hausa service and gradually became one of the prominent voices in the north.

Political career 
He started playing a role in the nation's governance in 1967, when he was appointed as a commissioner in the then North Central State of Nigeria (now Kaduna State). He was also secretary of a committee set up by General Hassan Katsina to unite the Northerners after a coup in 1966. In 1979, he was made Shagari's campaign manager for the successful presidential campaign of the National Party of Nigeria. During the nation's Second Republic, he played prominent roles as transport minister and head of the presidential task force on rice.

A military coup on 31 December 1983, overthrew the government of Shagari. Dikko fled into exile in London as well as a few other ministers and party officials of the National Party of Nigeria. The new military regime accused him of large-scale corruption while in office, in particular of embezzling millions of dollars from the nation's oil revenues.

On 5 July 1984, he played the central role in the Dikko Affair as he was found drugged in a crate at Stansted Airport that was being claimed as diplomatic baggage, an apparent victim of a government sanctioned kidnapping. The crate's destination was Lagos. 

He was the leader of Solidarity Group of Nigeria (SGN) that merged with the United Nigeria Congress Party during the Sani Abacha regime. In the Fourth Republic he formed the United Democratic Party (UDP), he was appointed to head the National Disciplinary Committee of the PDP in 2013.

He died in London in 2014, aged 77.

Notes

References
JO THOMAS, "BRITISH SEEK FOUR MORE IN KIDNAPPING OF NIGERIAN", The New York Times, 12 July 1984

1936 births
2014 deaths
Transport ministers of Nigeria
National Party of Nigeria politicians
Nigerian expatriates in the United Kingdom
Corruption in Nigeria
Politicians convicted of fraud
People convicted of money laundering
Prisoners and detainees of England and Wales
Nigerian people imprisoned abroad
Deaths in England
Nigerian politicians convicted of corruption